Chikoy National Park was officially created in 2014, on the mountain-steppe border region of south-central Siberia and Mongolia.  It is in the Krasnochikoysky District of the Zabaykalsky ("Trans-Baikal") administrative region of Russia.  This places the park about 250 miles southeast of Lake Baikal, on the edge of the Lake Baikal ecoregion.  The stated purpose for creating the park is the "preservation of unique natural complexes in the upper reaches of the river Chikoy".  While tourism and sport fishing will be encouraged, hunting and roads will be prohibited.

Geography
The national park is located in the Khentei-Daur Highlands, in the upper reaches of the Chikoy River of the Baikal Basin. The natural monument mountain Bystrinsky Golets, highest point of the Chikokon Range and of the highlands, is located in the park area.

Ecoregion and climate
This is part of the Daurian forest steppe ecoregion.  The park is in the transition zone between the Siberian taiga to the north and Mongolian steppe to the south.  The area is one of pine forests, mountain, steppe, and alpine meadows.

The climate of Chikoy is Subarctic climate, dry winter (Köppen climate classification subarctic climate. This climate is characterized by mild summers (only 1–3 months above ) and cold winters having monthly precipitation less than one-tenth of the wettest summer month.

See also
 Protected areas of Russia
 Buryatia

References

External links
 Government Resolution on the Creation of National Park Chikoy

Protected areas established in 2014
National parks of Russia
2014 establishments in Russia